Sebastián Herrera Cardona (born 23 January 1995 in Colombia) is a Colombian professional footballer who plays as a defender for MTK Budapest.

Career

Club career
He began his professional career at Deportivo Pereira where he made his senior debut playing in the Postobón Cup against their "Clásico Cafetero" rivals Once Caldas. On 1 July 2015 he signed a contract with Macedonian side Rabotnički where he played for 5 years and received Macedonian citizenship.

In 2020, he signed for MTK Budapest, one of Hungary's most successful clubs.

References

External links
 Sebastián Herrera at Soccerway

Colombian footballers
Living people
1995 births
Association football defenders
Sportspeople from Antioquia Department
FK Rabotnički players
Deportivo Pereira footballers
MTK Budapest FC players